Jean Kirkpatrick (March 2, 1923 - June 19, 2000) was an American sociologist. Long suffering from alcoholism herself, she created Women for Sobriety, an alternative or complement to the Twelve Steps program of Alcoholics Anonymous (AA).  The program serves women in particular and explicitly addresses self-image issues, as opposed to AA's focus upon admitting fault.

She created the Women for Sobriety program in 1975. This was after five years of research.

In 1987, Kirkpatrick commented that women did not need another form of "learned helplessness".  She asserted the Women for Sobriety program had 250 self-help groups in the United States, Australia, Africa, England and Germany.

Kirkpatrick herself began drinking in high school.  Drinking created difficulties for her in college, although she eventually graduated from the third college she attended, Moravian College, at age 27.  She completed a master's degree from Lehigh University four years later.  Later, after participating in an AA program, she enrolled in the Ph.D. program in sociology at University of Pennsylvania, and nearly completed it, but returned to drinking.  Sixteen years after she began the Ph.D., in 1971, she completed it.

She has been recognized for her contribution to helping women from alcoholism, including in 1978, when she received the Raymond Haupert Humanitarian Award from Moravian College.

Publications
She published several articles. She wrote A Fresh Start, a biographical book, which was published in 1977; and she wrote Goodbye Hangovers, Hello Life: Self Help for Women, which was published in 1986.

References

2000 deaths
American sociologists
American women sociologists
American writers
American women writers
1923 births
20th-century American women
20th-century American people
Moravian University alumni
University of Pennsylvania alumni